The Healthcare Safety Investigation Branch (HSIB) is the independent national investigator for patient safety in England. HSIB was formed in April 2017 and investigates serious patient safety risks that span the healthcare system, operating independently of other regulatory agencies. It aims to produce rigorous, non-punitive, and systematic investigations and to develop system-wide recommendations for learning and improvement and to be separate from systems that seek to allocate blame, liability, or punishment.

Organisation and investigations 
HSIB is currently hosted by NHS England but is intended to be operationally independent, and the Health and Care Bill 2021 proposes to make HSIB a fully independent body with a range of legal powers.

In June 2019 it employed about 200 full-time equivalent staff and its budget had increased from £3.8 million in 2017 to almost £20 million.  There were criticisms of the management of the organisation under chief investigator Keith Conradi.

England was the first country to adopt such a system. Norway has launched a similar organisation that became operational in 2019 called the National Investigation Board for the Health and Care Services.

In addition to its national investigation activities, from 2018 HSIB has been responsible for the investigation of maternity cases that involve intrapartum stillbirth, early neonatal deaths or severe brain injury. HSIB conducts around 1,000 maternity investigations each year.

It has already started producing reports on never events.

In February 2019 it produced a report into mistakes involving piped air being mistakenly supplied rather than piped oxygen and said that cost pressures could make it difficult for trusts to respond to safety alerts the financial costs of replacing equipment. Private finance initiative contracts increased those costs.

In January 2020 it called for systematic monitoring of eye health follow-up appointments after large numbers of patients had their sight put at risk from delayed follow-ups.

History and establishment 
In 2014 the House of Commons Public Administration Select Committee launched an inquiry to examine the investigation of clinical incidents in the NHS. This inquiry was prompted by research that identified a significant gap in the way the NHS investigated major safety failures that could have impacts across the entire healthcare system, and which proposed the creation of a national independent safety investigation body in healthcare similar to those that exist in the transport sector such as the Air Accident Investigation Branch.  The identities of witnesses are protected, to encourage them to speak freely.

In March 2015 the Public Administration Select Committee recommended that a new body be created to independently investigate major safety risks in the NHS. Those recommendations were accepted by the Government in July 2015. The Department of Health and Social Care and Secretary of State for Health, Jeremy Hunt, established an expert advisory group to determine the principles and approach of a new healthcare safety investigation body, and the group provided its recommendations in May 2016.

HSIB was established by legal direction in 2016, became operational in 2017 and is expected to gain full statutory independence as a result of the Health and Care Bill 2021.  The bill would mean that evidence given to it must be kept private.  It is therefore proposed to establish a new NHS special health authority to run the national maternity investigation programme as this is not wanted for maternity investigations.

In 2022 it was reported that the leadership was dominated by ‘Rasputin-like’ characters and displayed many of the bullying behaviours it was set up to help prevent in the NHS. Chief investigator Keith Conradi, who previously led the Air Accidents Investigation Branch, was said to position "himself like an emperor and appears just to give a thumbs up or down to things.”  Conradi, speaking to Roy Lilley as he was about to retire in July 2022, described the organisation's relationship with NHS England as “ambivalent” as patient safety was not their priority.

References

National Health Service (England)
Health and safety in the United Kingdom